A filter in turn is a type of traffic junction found in the Channel Islands. The basic concept is that vehicles are required to take turns to go through the junction. Filter in turn junctions take slightly different forms across the island.

Due to a signage change in Jersey, both islands now use the same sign to indicate a filter in turn.

Jersey 
In Jersey, there are five filter in turns.The first is a roundabout in Beaumont where traffic must take turns to move round the roundabout rather than the regular system of Give Way to the right.

Three of the junctions are on the St Helier ring road and were introduced in 2012. They are effectively merge in turn junctions at various gyratories on the system. They were introduced to improve road safety.

The final filter in turn is located at the end of Victoria Avenue. Traffic in both lanes where the dual carriageway reduces to a single carriageway must take it in turns to merge into the new lane in conditions of heavy traffic. These are accompanied by signs telling road users to use both lanes. This system exists to prevent the build-up of traffic during peak traffic times.

Guernsey 
In Guernsey, filter in turn junctions are more common than in Jersey and are used in a variety of road situations. This is because (unlike Jersey) Guernsey has no road classification system, and traffic speeds tend to be lower, so roads more often have equal priority. Guernsey often uses box junctions at filter in turns to ensure traffic filtering does not block other traffic at peak times. Unlike in Jersey, filter in turns have painted "FILTER" markings on the road.

Elsewhere 
While a formal filter-in-turn road rule does not exist elsewhere, road users in other countries may spontaneously adopt a similar arrangement from time to time at merge junctions where traffic is slow-moving and roughly equally heavy on both roads, even where one road has legal priority. A similar junction, known as an all-way stop, is common in North America and South Africa, where the vehicle that stops first proceeds first.

References

Road infrastructure
Road junction types
Roundabouts and traffic circles